The Duluth MN-WI Metropolitan Area, commonly called the Twin Ports, is a small metropolitan area centered around the cities of Duluth, Minnesota and Superior, Wisconsin. The Twin Ports are located at the western part of Lake Superior (the westernmost part of North America's Great Lakes) and together are considered one of the larger cargo ports in the United States. The Twin Ports are close to many natural attractions such as the North Shore, the Apostle Islands, and the Superior National Forest. 

The area is home to two long bridges: the Richard I. Bong Memorial Bridge (carrying U.S. Highway 2) and the John Blatnik Bridge (carrying I-535 and U.S. Highway 53).  Each bridge reaches across more than 1.5 miles (2.5 km) across the mouth of the Saint Louis River.  The Aerial Lift Bridge was constructed in 1905 and is on the National Register of Historic Places.  It must be raised each time a vessel enters or leaves Duluth's harbor; the inlet on the Wisconsin side is not similarly obstructed.

Together, the cities rank as the 19th-busiest port in the country overall (44.2 million short tons [40.1 million tonnes] per year) as of 2002, though the area is the 7th-busiest port (13.8 million short tons [12.5 million tonnes] per year) when measured on foreign exports alone.

The census bureau's Twin Ports metropolitan statistical area, an area much larger than the Duluth metropolitan area includes all of Wisconsin's Douglas County, and Minnesota's Carlton, Lake, and Saint Louis counties. With a 2020 census population of 291,638, the Duluth MSA ranked as the 170th largest metropolitan area in the United States. A tourist location that boasts many scenic natural amenities, approximately 6.7 million on average tourists visit The City of Duluth alone each year.

Communities 
Population as of 2020 Census

Principal city 
 
 Duluth (86,697)

Places with 10,000 to 50,000 inhabitants 

 Superior, WI (26,751)
 Cloquet (12,568)
 Hermantown (10,221)

Places with fewer than 10,000 inhabitants 

 Rice Lake (4,136)
 Saginaw (3,910) unincorporated
 Proctor (3,120)
 Esko (2,082)
 Scanlon (991)
 Carlton (948)
 Wrenshall (428)
 Oliver, WI (399)

Infrastructure 
The four tallest buildings are in Duluth, the Alworth Building, Historic Old Central High School, Maurices Headquarters, Medical Arts Building. The Bong Bridge leads to from Duluth to Superior. The Bong bridge was built in 1985 and is 11,800 ft (3,600 m) long. The Blatnik Bridge also leads to from Duluth to Superior. The Blatnik Bridge was built in 1965 and is 7,975 feet (2,431 m) long. Canal Park is a heavy tourist area in Downtown Duluth. In Virginia the tallest bridge in Minnesota (Hwy 53 Bridge) connecting Eveleth to Virginia. The Hwy 53 Bridge covers the Rouchleau Mine. The bridge opened in 2017 and is 204 ft. high in the air and spans 1,125 ft.

Hospitals 

 Essentia Health St. Mary's Medical Center - Duluth - (Level 1 Trauma Center)

 St. Luke's Hospital - Duluth - (Level 2 Trauma Center)

 Essentia Health St. Mary's Hospital - Superior - (Level 4 Trauma Center)

 Community Memorial Hospital - Cloquet - (Level 4 Trauma Center)

Shopping 
 Miller Hill Mall

Attractions 

 Aerial Lift Bridge
 AMSOIL Arena
 Bayfront Festival Park
 Blatnik Bridge
 Canal Park
 Enger Tower
 Glensheen Mansion
 Gooseberry Falls
 Great Lakes Aquarium
 Lake Superior Railroad Museum
 Leif Erikson Ship
 Minnesota Point
 Oldest Operating Hockey Arena in Minnesota
 Spirit Mountain Ski Area
 Tallest Bridge in Minnesota
 World's Largest Freestanding Hockey Stick

Education

Colleges and universities 

 College of St. Scholastica - Duluth
 Fond du Lac Tribal and Community College - Cloquet
 Lake Superior College - Duluth
 Northwood Technical College - Superior, WI
 University of Minnesota Duluth - Duluth
 University of Wisconsin, Superior - Superior, WI

Transportation

Major highways

Interstates 
  I-35
  I-535

U.S. Highways 
  US 2
  US 53
  US 169

Minnesota Highways 
  MN 23
  MN 61 – North Shore
  MN 194 – Central Entrance – Mesaba Avenue
  MN 210

St. Louis County Highways 
  Saint Louis County Road 4 – Rice Lake Road

Airports 

 Duluth International Airport - Duluth  (DLH)
 Sky Harbor Airport & Seaplane Base - Duluth  (KDYT)

MSA 
The Twin Ports metropolitan statistical area, an area much larger than the Duluth MN-WI metropolitan area,  includes 4 counties, of which 3 are in Minnesota and 1 in Wisconsin. St. Louis County is Minnesota's largest county by area. 

Duluth MN-WI Metropolitan Statistical Area

See also
 List of ports in the United States
 McDougall Duluth Shipbuilding Company
 Fraser Shipyards

References

External links
 Superior WI Community Links Page
 Twin Ports Commonwealth regional community cooperative

Geography of Douglas County, Wisconsin
Duluth–Superior metropolitan area
Transportation in Wisconsin
Geography of St. Louis County, Minnesota
Transportation in St. Louis County, Minnesota
Metropolitan areas of Minnesota
Metropolitan areas of Wisconsin
Water transportation in Wisconsin